The Boston Marathon bombing was a domestic terrorist attack that took place during the annual Boston Marathon on April 15, 2013.

Three days later, on April 18, Federal Bureau of Investigation (FBI) released images of two suspects. They were later identified as the Tsarnaev brothers, who were Chechen Kyrgyzstani-Americans. Following their identification, at 10:35p.m., they killed an MIT policeman. At 11:00p.m., they kidnapped a man in his car. At 12:15a.m., on April 19, the man escaped. At 12:45a.m., they had a shootout with the police in nearby Watertown, during which two officers were severely injured (one of whom, Dennis Simmonds, died a year later). Tamerlan was shot several times, and his brother Dzhokhar ran him over while escaping in the stolen car. Tamerlan died soon after.

An unprecedented manhunt for Dzhokhar ensued with thousands of law enforcement officers searching a 20-block area of Watertown. Residents of Watertown and surrounding communities were asked to stay indoors, and the transportation system and most businesses and public places closed. Around 6:00p.m., a Watertown resident discovered Dzhokhar hiding in a boat in his backyard. Dzhokhar was shot and wounded by police before being taken into custody.

During questioning, Dzhokhar said that he and his brother were motivated by the wars in Iraq and Afghanistan, that they were self-radicalized and unconnected to any outside terrorist groups, and that he was following his brother's lead. He said they learned to build explosive devices from the online magazine of Al-Qaeda in the Arabian Peninsula. He also said they had intended to travel to New York City to bomb Times Square. On April 8, 2015, he was convicted of 30 charges, including use of a weapon of mass destruction and malicious destruction of property resulting in death.

Two months later, he was sentenced to death, though in July 2020 the sentence was vacated by the United States Court of Appeals for the First Circuit. On March 22, 2021, a writ of certiorari was granted by the Supreme Court of the United States, which considered the questions of whether the lower court erred in vacating the death sentence. The Supreme Court heard arguments on October 13, 2021, as United States v. Tsarnaev; on March 4, 2022, the Court upheld the death penalty, reversing the First Circuit Court's decision.

Bombing 

The 117th annual Boston Marathon was run on Patriots' Day, April 15, 2013. The first exploded outside Marathon Sports at 671–673 Boylston Street at 2:49:43p.m. At the time of the first explosion, the race clock at the finish line showed 04:09:43the elapsed time since the Wave 3 start at 10:40a.m. The second bomb exploded at 2:49:57p.m., 14 seconds later and one block farther west at 755 Boylston Street. The explosions took place nearly three hours after the winning runner crossed the finish line, but with more than 5,700 runners yet to finish.

Windows on adjacent buildings were blown out, but there was no structural damage. Runners continued to cross the line until 2:57p.m.

Casualties and initial response 
Rescue workers and medical personnel, on hand as usual for the marathon, gave aid as additional police, fire, and medical units were dispatched, including from surrounding cities as well as private ambulances from all over the state. The explosions killed 3 civilians and injured 281 others, who were treated at 27 local hospitals. At least 14 people required amputations, with some suffering traumatic amputations as a direct result of the blasts.

Police, following emergency plans, diverted all remaining runners to Boston Common and Kenmore Square. The nearby Lenox Hotel and other buildings surrounding the scene were evacuated. Immediately after the bombing occurred and medically injured people were transported, the police closed a 15-block area around the blast site; this was reduced to a 12-block crime scene the next day. Boston police commissioner Edward F. Davis recommended that people stay off the streets.

Dropped bags and packages, abandoned as their owners fled from the blasts, increased uncertainty as to the possible presence of more bombs and many false reports were received. Simultaneously an electrical fire at the John F. Kennedy Presidential Library in nearby Dorchester was initially feared to be a bomb.

The airspace over Boston was restricted, and departures halted from Boston's Logan International Airport. Some local transit service was halted as well.

The Massachusetts Emergency Management Agency suggested people trying to contact those in the vicinity use text messaging instead of voice calls because of crowded cellphone lines. Cellphone service in Boston was congested but remained in operation, despite some local media reports stating that cell service was shut down to prevent cell phones from being used as detonators.

The American Red Cross helped concerned friends and family receive information about runners and casualties. The Boston Police Department also set up a call helpline for people concerned about relatives or acquaintances to contact and a line for people to provide information. Google Person Finder activated their disaster service under Boston Marathon Explosions to log known information about missing people as a publicly viewable file.

Due to the closure of several hotels near the blast zone, a number of visitors were left with nowhere to stay; many Boston-area residents opened their homes to them.

List of agencies that responded
There were many local, state and federal, as well as charity/volunteer, agencies that responded to the attack and the manhunt/investigation.

Some are listed here:

Law Enforcement
Boston Police Department (BPD)
Boston University Police Department 
Massachusetts Institute of Technology Police Department 
Watertown Police Department
Cambridge Police Department
Massachusetts Bay Transportation Authority Police
Massachusetts State Police (MSP)
Federal Bureau of Investigation (FBI)
Bureau of Alcohol, Tobacco, Firearms and Explosives (ATF)
United States Marshal Service (USMS)
Diplomatic Security Service (DSS)

Military and Federal
Massachusetts National Guard

Fire / Rescue
Boston Fire Department

Emergency Medical Services
Boston EMS
American Medical Response (AMR)
Fallon Ambulance Service
EasCare Ambulance Service

Investigation 

The Federal Bureau of Investigation led the investigation, assisted by the Bureau of Alcohol, Tobacco, Firearms and Explosives, the Central Intelligence Agency, the National Counterterrorism Center, and the Drug Enforcement Administration. It was initially believed by some that North Korea was behind the attack after escalating tensions and threats with the U.S.

United States government officials stated that there had been no intelligence reports suggesting such an attack. Representative Peter King, a member of the House Intelligence Committee, said: "I received two top secret briefings last week on the current threat levels in the United States, and there was no evidence of this at all."

After being identified, the father of the two suspects claimed that the FBI had been watching his family. He stated that they visited his sons' home in Cambridge, Massachusetts five times, most recently in 2011, as "preventive work... afraid there might be some explosions on the streets of Boston".

Evidence found near the blast sites included bits of metal, nails, ball bearings, black nylon pieces from a backpack, remains of an electronic circuit board, and wiring. A pressure cooker lid was found on a nearby rooftop. Both of the improvised explosive devices were pressure cooker bombs manufactured by the bombers. Authorities confirmed that the brothers used bomb-making instructions found in Al Qaeda in the Arabian Peninsula's Inspire magazine. After the suspects were identified, The Boston Globe reported that Tamerlan purchased fireworks from a fireworks store in New Hampshire.

On April 19, the FBI, West New York Police Department, and Hudson County Sheriff's Department seized computer equipment from the apartment of the Tsarnaevs' sister in West New York, New Jersey. On April 24, investigators reported that they had reconstructed the bombs, and believed that they had been triggered by remote controls used for toy cars.

April 18–19 shootings and manhunt

Release of suspect photos 
Jeff Bauman was immediately adjacent to one of the bombs and lost both legs; he wrote while in the hospital: "Bag, saw the guy, looked right at me". He later gave a detailed description of the suspects, which enabled images of them to be identified and circulated quickly.

At 5:20p.m. on April 18, three days after the bombing, the FBI released images of two suspects carrying backpacks, asking the public's help in identifying them. The FBI said that they were doing this in part to limit harm to people wrongly identified by news reports and on social-media.
As seen on video, the suspects stayed to observe the chaos after the explosions, then walked away casually. The public sent authorities a deluge of photographs and videos, which were scrutinized by both authorities and online public social networks.

MIT shooting and carjacking 

Around 7:40 pm, a few hours after the photos were released, the Tsarnaev brothers ambushed and shot Sean A. Collier of the Massachusetts Institute of Technology Police Department six times in an attempt to steal his Smith & Wesson M&P45 sidearm, which they could not free from his holster because of its security retention system. Collier, aged 27, was seated in his police car near Building 32 on the Massachusetts Institute of Technology campus. He died soon after.

The brothers then carjacked a Mercedes-Benz M-Class SUV in the Allston-Brighton neighborhood of Boston. Tamerlan took the owner, Chinese national Dun "Danny" Meng, hostage and told him that he (Tamerlan) was responsible for the Boston bombing and for killing a police officer. Dzhokhar followed them in their green Honda Civic, later joining them in the Mercedes-Benz. Interrogation later revealed that the brothers "decided spontaneously" that they wanted to go to New York and bomb Times Square.

The Tsarnaev brothers forced Meng to use his ATM cards to obtain $800 in cash. They transferred objects to the Mercedes-Benz and one brother followed it in their Civic, for which an all-points bulletin was issued. The Tsarnaev brothers then drove to a Shell gas station to fill up for a long ride to Times Square, New York City to set off more explosives. But while Dzhokhar went inside to pay for junk food, Meng, fearing that the suspects would harm him during the long drive, escaped from the Mercedes and ran across the street to the Mobil gas station, asking the clerk to call 911. His cell phone remained in the vehicle, allowing the police to focus their search on Watertown.

Watertown shootout 
Shortly after midnight on April 19, Watertown police officer Joseph Reynolds identified the brothers in the Honda and the stolen Mercedes after overhearing radio traffic that the vehicle was "pinged" by Cambridge officers on Dexter Avenue in Watertown. Reynolds followed the vehicle while waiting for additional units to perform a high-risk traffic stop when the suspect vehicles both turned onto Laurel Street and stopped at the intersection of Laurel and Dexter.

Tamerlan Tsarnaev stepped out of the Mercedes and immediately opened fire on Officer Reynolds and Sergeant John MacLellan, who both returned fire and requested emergency assistance over their radios. A gun battle ensued between Tsarnaev, the aforementioned officers, and additional officers responding to the "shots fired" radio transmissions from Reynolds and MacLellan in the 100 block of Laurel St. An estimated 200 to 300 shots were fired. The suspects shot 56 times, detonated at least one pressure cooker bomb, and threw five "crude grenades" three of which exploded.

The agencies involved in the nearly seven-minute shootout included the Watertown Police Department, Cambridge Police Department, Boston Police Department, Massachusetts State Police (MSP), Boston University Police Department, and MBTA Transit Police Department. Most of the officers involved were equipped by their respective agencies with either the Glock 22 or Glock 23 .40 S&W-caliber pistols. MSP troopers were armed with Smith & Wesson M&P45 pistols chambered in .45 ACP; this led investigators to match the 9mm casings and projectiles found at the scene to the suspects' 9mm Ruger P95 pistol.

According to Watertown Police Chief Edward Deveau, the brothers had an "arsenal of guns". Tamerlan eventually ran out of ammunition and threw his empty Ruger pistol at Watertown PD Sergeant Jeffrey Pugliese, who subsequently tackled him with assistance from Sergeant MacLellan.

Tamerlan's younger brother Dzhokhar then drove the stolen SUV toward Tamerlan and the police, who unsuccessfully tried to drag Tamerlan out of the car's path and handcuff him; the car ran over Tamerlan and dragged him a short distance down the street, narrowly missing the Watertown officers. Watertown Sgt. MacLellan later stated that the younger brother had thought they were doing CPR on another officer and tried to run them over. Dzhokhar abandoned the car half a mile away and fled on foot. Badly wounded, Tamerlan Tsarnaev was taken into custody and died at 1:35a.m. at Beth Israel Deaconess Medical Center.

Massachusetts Bay Transportation Authority Police Officer Richard H. Donohue Jr. was critically wounded in the leg in crossfire from other officers shooting at the fleeing vehicle, but survived. Boston Police Department officer Dennis Simmonds was injured by a hand grenade and died on April 10, 2014. 15 other officers were also injured. A later report by Harvard Kennedy School's Program on Crisis Leadership concluded that lack of coordination among police agencies had put the public at excessive risk during the shootout.

Only one firearm was recovered at the scene, Tsarnaev's Ruger P95, which was found to have a defaced serial number.

Identification and search for suspects 

Records on the Honda left at the scene identified the men as two brothers whose family had migrated to the United States from Kyrgyzstan seeking political asylum around 2002: 26-year-old Tamerlan Tsarnaev and 19-year-old Dzhokhar "Jahar" Tsarnaev.  The FBI released additional photos of the two during the Watertown incident. Early on April 19, Watertown residents received automated calls asking them to stay indoors. That same morning Governor Patrick asked residents of Watertown and adjacent cities and towns to "shelter in place". Somerville residents also received automated calls instructing them to shelter in place.

A 20-block area of Watertown was cordoned off and residents were told not to leave their homes or answer the door, as officers scoured the area in tactical gear. Helicopters circled the area and SWAT teams in armored vehicles moved through in formation, with officers going door to door and searching houses. These actions generated discussions about the legality of searching large numbers of houses without a search warrant, with The Atlantic stating that this kind of search is legal due to exigent circumstances. On the scene were the FBI, the Bureau of Alcohol, Tobacco, Firearms and Explosives, Diplomatic Security Service, HSI-ICE, the National Guard, the Boston, Cambridge, Watertown Police departments, and the Massachusetts State Police. The show of force was the first major field test of the interagency task forces created in the wake of the September 11 attacks.

The entire public transit network and most Boston taxi services were suspended, as was Amtrak service to and from Boston. Logan International Airport remained open under heightened security. Universities, schools, many businesses, and other facilities were closed as thousands of law enforcement personnel participated in the door-to-door manhunt in Watertown. Others followed up on other leads, including searching the house that the brothers shared in Cambridge, where seven improvised explosive devices were found.

The brothers' father spoke from his home in Makhachkala, Dagestan, encouraging Dzhokhar to: "Give up. You have a bright future ahead of you. Come home to Russia." He continued, "If they killed him, then all hell would break loose." On television, Dzhokhar's uncle from Montgomery Village, Maryland pleaded with him to turn himself in.

Discovery and capture 

On the evening of April 19, two hours after the shelter-in-place order had been lifted, David Henneberry, a Watertown resident outside the search area, noticed that the tarp was loose on his parked boat. Investigating, he saw a body lying inside the boat in a pool of blood. He contacted the authorities, who surrounded the boat. A police helicopter verified movement through a thermal imaging device. The figure inside started poking at the tarp, prompting police to shoot at the boat.

According to Boston Police Commissioner Ed Davis and Watertown Police Chief Deveau, Dzhokhar Tsarnaev was shooting at police from inside the boat, "exchanging fire for an hour". A subsequent report indicated that the firing lasted for a shorter time. Despite this, Tsarnaev was found to have no weapon when he was captured.

Dzhokhar Tsarnaev was arrested at 8:42p.m. and taken to Beth Israel Deaconess Medical Center, where he was listed in critical condition with gunshot wounds to the head, neck, legs, and hand. Initial reports that the neck wound represented a suicide attempt were contradicted by him being unarmed. The situation was chaotic, according to a police source quoted by The Washington Post, and the firing of weapons occurred during "the fog of war". A subsequent review by the Commonwealth of Massachusetts provided this more specific summary: "One officer fired his weapon without appropriate authority in response to perceived movement in the boat, and surrounding officers followed suit in a round of 'contagious fire', assuming they were being fired on by Tsarnaev. Weapons continued to be fired for several seconds until on scene supervisors ordered a ceasefire and regained control of the scene. The unauthorized shots created another dangerous crossfire situation".

These confusions were caused in part by a lack of clearly identified and coordinated law enforcement command of the thousands of officers from surrounding communities who self-deployed into the Watertown area during the events.

Legal proceedings

Interrogation 
United States Senators Kelly Ayotte, Saxby Chambliss, Lindsey Graham, and John McCain, and Representative Peter T. King suggested that Dzhokhar Tsarnaev, a U.S. citizen, should be tried as an unlawful enemy combatant rather than as a criminal, potentially preventing him from obtaining legal counsel. Others said that doing so would be illegal, including prominent American legal scholar and lawyer Alan Dershowitz, and would jeopardize the prosecution. The government decided to try Dzhokhar in the federal criminal court system and not as an enemy combatant.

Dzhokhar was questioned for 16 hours by investigators but stopped communicating with them on the night of April 22 after Judge Marianne Bowler read him a Miranda warning. Dzhokhar had not previously been given a Miranda warning, as federal law enforcement officials invoked the warning's public safety exception. This raised doubts whether his statements during this investigation would be admissible as evidence and led to a debate surrounding Miranda rights.

Charges and detention 

On April 22, 2013, formal criminal charges were brought against Tsarnaev in the United States District Court for the District of Massachusetts during a bedside hearing while he was hospitalized. He was charged with use of a weapon of mass destruction and with malicious destruction of property resulting in death. Some of the charges carry potential sentences of life imprisonment or the death penalty. Tsarnaev was judged to be awake, mentally competent, and lucid, and he responded to most questions by nodding. The judge asked him whether he was able to afford an attorney and he said no; he was represented by the Federal Public Defender's office. FMC Devens is a federal prison medical facility at a former Army base where he was held in solitary confinement at a segregated housing unit with 23-hour-per-day lockdown.

On July 10, 2013, Tsarnaev pleaded not guilty to 30 charges in his first public court appearance, including a murder charge for MIT police officer Sean Collier. He was back in court for a status hearing on September 23, and his lawyers requested more time to prepare their defense. On October 2, Tsarnaev's attorneys asked the court to lift the special administrative measures (SAMs) imposed by Attorney General Holder in August, saying that the measures had left Tsarnaev unduly isolated from communication with his family and lawyers, and that no evidence suggested that he posed a future threat.

Trial and sentencing 

Jury selection began on January 5, 2015, and was completed on March 3, with a jury consisting of eight men and ten women (including six alternates). The trial began on March 4 with Assistant U.S. Attorney William Weinreb describing the bombing and painting Dzhokhar as "a soldier in a holy war against Americans" whose motive was "reaching paradise". He called the brothers equal participants.

Defense attorney Judy Clarke admitted that Dzhokhar Tsarnaev had placed the second bomb and was present at the murder of Sean Collier, the carjacking of Dun Meng, and the Watertown shootout, but she emphasized the influence that his older brother had on him, portraying him as a follower. Between March 4 and 30, prosecutors called more than 90 witnesses, including bombing survivors who described losing limbs in the attack, and the government rested its case on March 30. The defense rested as well on March 31, after calling four witnesses.

Tsarnaev was found guilty on all 30 counts on April 8.  The sentencing phase of the trial began on April 21, and a further verdict was reached on May 15 in which it was recommended that he be put to death. Tsarnaev was sentenced to death on June 24, after apologizing to the victims. In 2018 Tsarnaev's lawyers appealed on the grounds that a lower-court judge's refusal to move the case to another city not traumatized by the bombings deprived him of a fair trial.

On July 30, 2020, Tsarnaev's death sentence was reversed by the United States Court of Appeals for the First Circuit, which found that, during jury selection, the District Court did not properly screen prospective jurors on how much they had heard of the case. The First Circuit vacated the death sentence and three of the other thirty convictions against Tsarnaev, and ordered a new penalty phase jury trial with fresh jurors, leaving the decision of a new change of venue to the District Court. Tsarnaev's remaining convictions still carried multiple life sentences, ensuring that he would remain in prison regardless of the results of the new trial. The United States government appealed this ruling to the U.S. Supreme Court, which granted certiorari in the case United States v. Tsarnaev in March 2021, which was argued before the Court on October 13, 2021. On March 4, 2022, the Supreme Court reversed the decision of the First Circuit and reinstated Tsarnaev's death penalty.

Motives and backgrounds of the Tsarnaev brothers

Motives 
According to FBI interrogators, Dzhokhar and his brother were motivated by extremist beliefs but "were not connected to any known terrorist groups", instead learning to build explosive weapons from an online magazine published by al-Qaeda affiliates in Yemen. They further alleged that "Dzhokhar and his brother considered suicide attacks and striking the Boston Pops Fireworks Spectacular on the Fourth of July"; but ultimately decided to use remotely-activated pressure cooker bombs and other IEDs. Fox News reported that the brothers "chose the prestigious race as a 'target of opportunity' ... [after] the building of the bombs came together more quickly than expected".

Dzhokhar said that he and his brother wanted to defend Islam from the U.S., accusing the U.S. of conducting the Iraq War and War in Afghanistan against Muslims. A CBS report revealed that Dzhokhar had scrawled a note with a marker on the interior wall of the boat where he was hiding; the note stated that the bombings were "retribution for U.S. military action in Afghanistan and Iraq", and called the Boston victims "collateral damage", "in the same way innocent victims have been collateral damage in U.S. wars around the world". Photographs of the note were later used in the trial.

Some political science and public policy writers suggest that Islam may have played a secondary role in the attacks. These writers theorize that the primary motives might have been sympathy towards the political aspirations in the Caucasus region and Tamerlan's inability to become fully integrated into American society. According to the Los Angeles Times, a law enforcement official said that Dzhokhar "did not seem as bothered about America's role in the Muslim world" as his brother Tamerlan had been. Dzhokhar identified Tamerlan as the "driving force" behind the bombing, and said that his brother had only recently recruited him to help.

Some journalists and Dzhokhar Tsarnaev's defense attorney have suggested that the FBI may have recruited or attempted to recruit Tamerlan Tsarnaev as an informant.

Backgrounds  

Tamerlan Tsarnaev was born in 1986 in the Kalmyk Autonomous Soviet Socialist Republic, North Caucasus. Dzhokhar was born in 1993 in Kyrgyzstan, although some reports say that his family claims that he was born in Dagestan. The family spent time in Tokmok, Kyrgyzstan, and in Makhachkala, Dagestan.
They are half Chechen through their father Anzor, and half Avar through their mother Zubeidat. They never lived in Chechnya, yet the brothers identified themselves as Chechen.

The Tsarnaev family immigrated to the United States in 2002 where they applied for political asylum, settling in Cambridge, Massachusetts. Tamerlan Tsarnaev attended Bunker Hill Community College but dropped out to become a boxer. His goal was to gain a place on the U.S. Olympic boxing team, saying that, "unless his native Chechnya becomes independent", he would "rather compete for the United States than for Russia". He married U.S. citizen Katherine Russell on July 15, 2010, in the Masjid Al Quran Mosque. While initially quoted in a student magazine as saying, "I don't have a single American friend. I don't understand them," a later FBI interview report documents Tamerlan stating it was a misquote, and that most of his friends were American.  He had a history of violence, including an arrest in July 2009 for assaulting his girlfriend.

The brothers were Muslim; Tamerlan's aunt stated that he had recently become a devout Muslim. Tamerlan became more devout and religious after 2009, and a YouTube channel in his name was linked to Salafist and Islamist videos. The FBI was informed by the Russian Federal Security Service (FSB) in 2011 that he was a "follower of radical Islam". In response, the FBI interviewed Tamerlan and his family and searched databases, but they did not find any evidence of "terrorism activity, domestic or foreign". During the 2012 trip to Dagestan, Tamerlan was reportedly a frequent visitor at a mosque on Kotrova Street in Makhachkala, believed by the FSB to be linked with radical Islam. Some believe that "they were motivated by their faith, apparently an anti-American, radical version of Islam" acquired in the U.S., while others believe that the turn happened in Dagestan.

At the time of the bombing, Dzhokhar Tsarnaev was a student at the University of Massachusetts Dartmouth with a major in marine biology. He became a naturalized U.S. citizen on September 11, 2012. Tamerlan's boxing coach reported to NBC that the young brother was greatly affected by Tamerlan and admired him.

Tamerlan was previously connected to the triple homicide in Waltham, Massachusetts, on the evening of September 11, 2011, but he was not a suspect at the time. Brendan Mess, Erik Weissman, and Raphael Teken were murdered in Mess's apartment. All had their throats slit from ear to ear with such great force that they were nearly decapitated. The local district attorney said that it appeared that the killer and the victims knew each other, and that the murders were not random. Tamerlan Tsarnaev had previously described murder victim Brendan Mess as his "best friend". After the bombing and subsequent revelations of Tsarnaev's personal life, the Waltham murders case was reexamined in April 2013 with Tsarnaev as a new suspect. Both ABC and The New York Times have reported that there is strong evidence which implicates Tsarnaev in this triple homicide.

Some analysts claim that the Tsarnaevs' mother Zubeidat Tsarnaeva is a radical extremist and supporter of jihad who influenced her sons' behavior. This prompted the Russian government to warn the U.S. government on two occasions about the family's behavior. Both Tamerlan and his mother were placed on a terrorism watch list about 18 months before the bombing took place.

Other arrests, detentions, and prosecutions

People detained and released 
On April 15, several people who were near the scene of the blast were taken into custody and questioned about the bombing, including a Saudi man whom police stopped as he was walking away from the explosion; they detained him when some of his responses made them uncomfortable. Law enforcement searched his residence in a Boston suburb, and the man was found to have no connection to the attack. An unnamed U.S. official said, "he was just at the wrong place at the wrong time".

On the night of April 18, two men who were riding in a taxi in the vicinity of the shootout were arrested and released shortly thereafter when police determined that they were not involved in the Marathon attacks. Another man was arrested several blocks from the site of the shootout and was forced to strip naked by police who feared that he might have concealed explosives. He was released that evening after a brief investigation determined that he was an innocent bystander.

Ibragim Todashev 

On May 22, the FBI interrogated Ibragim Todashev in Orlando, Florida, who was a Chechen from Boston. During the interrogation, he was shot and killed by an FBI agent who claimed that Todashev attacked him. The New York Times quoted an unnamed law enforcement official as saying that Todashev had confessed to a triple homicide, and had implicated Tsarnaev as well. Todashev's father claimed his son was innocent and that federal investigators were biased against Chechens and made up their case against him.

Dias Kadyrbayev, Azamat Tazhayakov, and Robel Phillipos

Personal backgrounds 
Robel Phillipos (19) was a U.S. citizen of Ethiopian descent living in Cambridge who was arrested and faced with charges of knowingly making false statements to police. He graduated from high school in 2011 with Dzhokhar Tsarnaev.
Dias Kadyrbayev (19) and Azamat Tazhayakov (20) were natives of Kazakhstan living in the U.S. They were Dzhokhar Tsarnaev's roommates in an off-campus housing complex in New Bedford, Massachusetts where Tsarnaev had sometimes stayed.

Phillipos, Kadyrbayev, Tazhayakov, and Tsarnaev entered the University of Massachusetts Dartmouth in the fall of 2011 and knew each other well. After seeing photos of Tsarnaev on television, they traveled to his dorm room where Kadyrbayev and Tazhayakov retrieved a backpack and laptop belonging to Tsarnaev, while Phillipos acted as lookout. The backpack was discarded, but police recovered it and its contents in a nearby New Bedford landfill on April 26. During interviews, the men initially denied visiting the dorm room but later admitted their actions.

Arrests and legal proceedings 
Kadyrbayev and Tazhayakov were arrested by police at the off-campus housing complex during the night of April 18–19. An unidentified girlfriend of one of the men was also arrested, but all three were soon released.

Kadyrbayev and Tazhayakov were re-arrested in New Bedford on April 20 and held on immigration-related violations. They appeared before a federal immigration judge on May 1 and were charged with overstaying their student visas. That same day, they were charged criminally with:

Kadyrbayev and Tazhayakov were indicted by a federal grand jury on August 8, 2013, on charges of conspiracy to obstruct justice for helping Dzhokhar Tsarnaev dispose of a laptop computer, fireworks, and a backpack after the bombing. Each faced up to 25 years in prison and deportation if convicted. Tazhayakov was convicted of obstruction of justice and conspiracy on July 21, 2014.

Kadyrbayev pleaded guilty to obstruction charges on August 22, 2014, but sentencing was delayed pending the U.S. Supreme Court's ruling in Yates v. United States. Kadyrbayev was sentenced to six years in prison in June 2015. He was deported to Kazakhstan in October 2018.

Tazhayakov pleaded not guilty and went to trial, arguing that "Kadyrbayev was the mastermind behind destroying the evidence and that Tazhayakov only 'attempted obstruction'." Jurors returned a guilty verdict, however, and he was sentenced to 42 months ( years) in prison in June 2015. U.S. District Judge Douglas Woodlock gave a lighter sentence to Tazhayakov than to Kadyrbayev, who was viewed as more culpable. Tazhayakov was released in May 2016 and subsequently deported.

Phillipos was arrested and faced charges of knowingly making false statements to police. He was released on $100,000 bail and placed under house confinement with an ankle monitor. He was convicted on October 28, 2014 on two charges of lying about being in Tsarnaev's dorm room. He later acknowledged that he was in the room while two friends removed a backpack containing potential evidence relating to the bombing.

Phillipos faced a maximum sentence of eight years' imprisonment on each count. In June 2015, U.S. District Judge Douglas P. Woodlock sentenced him to three years in prison. Phillipos filed an appeal, but his sentence was upheld in court on February 28, 2017.

Phillipos was released from prison in Philadelphia on February 26, 2018 and began serving a three-year probationary period.

Khairullozhon Matanov 

A federal indictment was unsealed against Khairullozhon Matanov on May 30, 2014, charging him with "one count of destroying, altering, and falsifying records, documents, and tangible objects in a federal investigation, specifically information on his computer, and three counts of making materially false, fictitious, and fraudulent statements in a federal terrorism investigation". Matanov bought dinner for the two Tsarnaev brothers 40 minutes after the bombing.  After the Tsarnaev brothers' photos were released to the public, Matanov viewed the photos on the CNN and FBI websites before attempting to reach Dzhokhar, and then tried to give away his cell phone and delete hundreds of documents from his computer. Prosecutors said that Matanov attempted to mislead investigators about the nature of his relationship with the brothers and to conceal that he shared their philosophy of violence.

Matanov was originally from Kyrgyzstan. He came to the U.S. in 2010 on a student visa, and later claimed asylum. He attended Quincy College for two years before dropping out to become a taxicab driver. He was living in Quincy, Massachusetts, at the time of his arrest, and was a friend of Tamerlan Tsarnaev.

In March 2015, Matanov pleaded guilty to all four counts. In June 2015, he was sentenced to 30 months in prison.

Victims

Deaths 
Three people were killed as a direct result of the bombings. Krystle Marie Campbell, a 29-year-old restaurant manager from Medford, Massachusetts, was killed by the first bomb. Lü Lingzi, a 23-year-old Chinese national and Boston University statistics graduate student from Shenyang, Liaoning, and 8-year-old Martin William Richard from the Dorchester neighborhood of Boston, were both killed by the second bomb.

Sean Allen Collier, 27 years old, was shot and killed by the bombers as he sat in his patrol car on April 18, at about 10:48p.m. He was an MIT police officer, and had been with the Somerville Auxiliary Police Department from 2006 to 2009. He died from multiple gunshot wounds.

Boston Police Department officer Dennis Simmonds died on April 10, 2014, from head injuries he received during the Watertown shootout a year before.

Injuries 
About 281 civilians were treated at 27 local hospitals. Eleven days later, 29 remained hospitalized, one in critical condition. Many victims had lower leg injuries and shrapnel wounds, which indicated that the devices were low to the ground. At least 16 civilians lost limbs, at the scene or by surgical amputation, and three lost more than one limb.

Similar objects were found at the scene. The New York Times cited doctors as saying that the bombs mainly injured legs, ankles, and feet because they were low to the ground, instead of fatally injuring abdomens, chests, shoulders, and heads. Some victims had perforated eardrums.

MBTA police officer Richard H. Donohue Jr. (33) was critically wounded during a firefight with the bombers just after midnight on April 19. He lost almost all of his blood, and his heart stopped for 45 minutes, during which time he was kept alive by cardiopulmonary resuscitation. The Boston Globe reported that Donohue may have been accidentally shot by a fellow officer.

Marc Fucarile lost his right leg and received severe burns and shrapnel wounds. He was the last victim released from hospital care on July 24, 2013. Courtney Kelleigh, who ran for the National Multiple Sclerosis Society, had hypothermia with no permanent damage.

Reactions 
Law enforcement, local and national politicians, and various heads of state reacted quickly to the bombing, generally condemning the act and expressing sympathies for the victims. Spontaneous, improvised temporary memorials appeared at the sites of the deaths in Boston and Cambridge. Over the next few years, permanent memorials were constructed and dedicated at these locations.

Aid to victims 

The One Fund Boston was established by Massachusetts Governor Deval Patrick and Boston mayor Thomas Menino to make monetary distributions to bombing victims. The Boston Strong concert at the TD Garden in Boston on May 30, 2013, benefitted the One Fund, which ultimately received more than $69.8 million in donations. A week after the bombing, crowd funding websites received more than 23,000 pledges promising more than $2 million for the victims, their families, and others affected by the bombing. The Israel Trauma Coalition for Response and Preparedness sent six psychologists and specialists from Israel to help Boston emergency responders, government administrators, and community people develop post-terrorist attack recovery strategies.

Local reactions 

Numerous sporting events, concerts, and other public entertainment were postponed or cancelled in the days following the bombing. The MBTA public transit system was under heavy National Guard and police presence and it was shut down a second time April 19 during the manhunt.

In the days after the bombing, makeshift memorials began to spring up along the cordoned-off area surrounding Boylston Street. The largest was located on Arlington Street, the easternmost edge of the barricades, starting with flowers, tokens, and T-shirts. In June, the Makeshift Memorial located in Copley Square was taken down and the memorial objects located there were moved to the archives in  West Roxbury for cleaning, fumigation, and archiving.

Five years after the bombing, The Boston Globe reported all of the items from the memorials were being housed in a climate controlled environment, free of charge, by the storage company, Iron Mountain in Northborough, Massachusetts. Some of the items are also being stored in Boston's city archives in West Roxbury.

Boston University established a scholarship in honor of Lü Lingzi, a student who died in the bombing. University of Massachusetts Boston did the same in honor of alumna and bombing victim Krystle Campell.

The Massachusetts Institute of Technology established a scholarship, and erected a large abstract environmental sculpture outdoors called the Sean Collier Memorial, both in memory of slain MIT Police officer Sean Collier. The open-arched monolithic stone enclosure was proposed, designed, funded, fabricated, and installed on campus in less than two years after the bombing, and formally unveiled on April 29, 2015.

One study conducted by the Institute for Public Service at Suffolk University in Boston, Massachusetts, recorded the mental health and emotional response of various survivors, for three years following the bombing. In doing so, it reviewed the kinds of aid that were available in local hospitals and offered advice on how a person or community may be healed. This study also mentions that after recognizing the downgraded media coverage of people in the city being killed or injured on a daily basis, the city of Boston "applied for and received a grant from The Rockefeller Foundation to be part of their 100 resilient cities network and to develop a cross cutting resilience strategy".

However, there was rising anti-Muslim sentiment online and locally in the weeks following the bombing, causing distress in the local Muslim community and making some afraid to leave their homes.

Three stone pillars lit by abstract sculptural bronze lighting columns memorializing three victims were installed at the two separate bombing sites on August 19, 2019. Two bronze sidewalk bricks were installed to memorialize police officers killed in the aftermath, and cherry trees were planted nearby to bloom each April.

The Catholic bishops of Massachusetts opposed the death penalty for terrorist bomber Dzhokhar Tsarnaev, citing the need to build a culture of life.

National reactions 
President Barack Obama addressed the nation after the attack. He said that the perpetrators were still unknown, but that the government would "get to the bottom of this" and that those responsible "will feel the full weight of justice". He ordered flags to half-staff until April 20 on all federal buildings as "a mark of respect for the victims of the senseless acts of violence perpetrated on April 15, 2013 in Boston, Massachusetts".

Moments of silence were held at various events across the country, including at the openings of the New York Stock Exchange, NASDAQ, and NYMEX on the day after the bombing. Numerous special events were held, including marathons and other runs. Islamic organizations in the United States condemned the attacks.

International reactions 

The bombing was denounced and condolences were offered by many international leaders as well as leading figures from international sport. Security measures were increased worldwide in the wake of the attack.

In China, users posted condolence messages on Weibo in response to the death of Lü Lingzi. Chris Buckley of The New York Times said "Ms. Lu's death gave a melancholy face to the attraction that America and its colleges exert over many young Chinese." Laurie Burkitt of The Wall Street Journal said "Ms. Lu's death resonates with many in China" due to the one-child policy.

Organizers of the London Marathon, which was held six days after the Boston bombing, reviewed security arrangements for their event. Hundreds of extra police officers were drafted in to provide a greater presence on the streets, and a record 700,000 spectators lined the streets. Runners in London observed a 30-second silence in respect for the victims of Boston shortly before the race began, and many runners wore black ribbons on their vests. Organizers also pledged to donate US$3 to a fund for Boston Marathon victims for every person who finished the race.

Organizers of the 2013 Vancouver Sun Run, which was held on April 21, 2013, donated $10 from every late entry for the race to help victims of the bombing at the Boston Marathon. Jamie Pitblado, vice-president of promotions for The Vancouver Sun and The Province, said the money would go to One Fund Boston, an official charity that collected donations for the victims and their families. Sun Run organizers raised anywhere from $25,000 to $40,000. There were over 48,000 participants, many dressed in blue and yellow (Boston colors) with others wearing Boston Red Sox caps.

Petr Gandalovic, ambassador of the Czech Republic, released a statement after noticing much confusion on Facebook and Twitter between his nation and the Chechen Republic. "The Czech Republic and Chechnya are two very different entities – the Czech Republic is a Central European country; Chechnya is a part of the Russian Federation."

Security was also stepped up in Singapore in response to online threats made on attacking several locations in the city-state and the Singapore Marathon in December. Two suspects were investigated and one was eventually arrested for making false bomb threats.

Russian reaction 
The Russian government said that special attention would be paid to security at upcoming international sports events in Russia, including the 2014 Winter Olympics. According to the Russian embassy in the U.S., President Vladimir Putin condemned the bombing as a "barbaric crime" and "stressed that the Russian Federation will be ready, if necessary, to assist in the U.S. authorities' investigation". He urged closer cooperation of security services with Western partners but other Russian authorities and mass media blamed the U.S. authorities for negligence as they warned the U.S. of the Tsarnaevs. Moreover Russian authorities and mass media since the spring of 2014 blame the United States for politically motivated false information about the lack of response from Russian authorities after subsequent U.S. requests. As proof a letter from the Russian FSB was shown to the members of an official U.S. Congressional delegation to Moscow during their visit. This letter with information about Tsarnaev (including his biography details, connections and phone number) had been sent from the FSB to the FBI and CIA during March 2011.

Republican U.S. Senators Saxby Chambliss and Richard Burr reported that Russian authorities had separately asked both the FBI (at least twice: during March and November 2011) and the CIA (September 2011) to look carefully into Tamerlan Tsarnaev and provide more information about him back to Russia. FSB secretly recorded phone conversations between Tamerlan Tsarnaev and his mother (they vaguely and indirectly discussed jihad) and sent these to the FBI as evidence of possible extremist links within the family. However, while Russia offered US intelligence services warnings that Tsarnaev planned to link up with extremist groups abroad, an FBI investigation yielded no evidence to support those claims at the time. In addition, subsequent U.S. requests for additional information about Tsarnaev went unanswered by the Russians.

Chechen reactions 
On April 19, 2013, the press-secretary of the head of the Chechen Republic, Ramzan Kadyrov, issued a statement that, inter alia, read: "The Boston bombing suspects have nothing to do with Chechnya". On the same day, Kadyrov was reported by The Guardian to have written on Instagram:

Akhmed Zakayev, head of the secular wing of the Chechen separatist movement, now in exile in London, condemned the bombing as "terrorist" and expressed condolences to the families of the victims. Zakayev denied that the bombers were in any way representative of the Chechen people, saying that "the Chechen people never had and can not have any hostile feelings toward the United States and its citizens".

The Mujahideen of the Caucasus Emirate Province of Dagestan, the Caucasian Islamist organization in both Chechnya and Dagestan, denied any link to the bombing or the Tsarnaev brothers and stated that it was at war with Russia, not the United States. It also said that it had sworn off violence against civilians since 2012.

Criticism of the "shelter-in-place" directive and house-to-house searches 
During the manhunt for the perpetrators of the bombing, Governor Deval Patrick said "we are asking people to shelter in place". The request was highly effective; most people stayed home, causing Boston, Watertown, and Cambridge to come to a virtual standstill. According to Time magazine, "media described residents complying with a 'lockdown order,' but in reality the governor's security measure was a request". Scott Silliman, emeritus director of the Center on Law, Ethics and National Security at Duke Law School, said that the shelter-in-place request was voluntary.

The shelter-in-place directive was criticized by some commentators. Michael Cohen of The Observer said that Americans have little experience with daily terrorism compared to some countries and "are more primed to ... assume the absolute worst". Cohen wrote that it was not the first time dangerous murderers have been on the loose in a large American city (citing Christopher Dorner in 2013 and the Beltway sniper attacks in 2002), but noted that "lockdown" measures were not used in those cases.  Former congressman and presidential candidate Ron Paul criticized what he described as a "military-style takeover of parts of Boston" during the investigation and wrote that "this unprecedented move should frighten us as much or more than the attack itself".

Haaretz Chemi Salev wrote that "in terms of cost-benefit analysis, from the evil terrorist's point of view, the Boylston Street bombings and their aftermath can only be viewed as a resounding triumph" since the "relatively amateurish" terrorists managed to intimidate a vast number of people and got a maximum amount of publicity. Responding to Salev in The New York Times, Ross Douthat commented that the massive manhunt operation might deter other amateur terrorists, but not hard-core terrorists such as Mohammed Atta. Douthat argued that out-of-the-ordinary measures can only be used when terrorism itself is out-of-the-ordinary: if attacks started to occur more often, people would not be as willing to comply with shelter-in-place commands, yet once a terrorist has been hunted with such an operation, it is hard to justify why such measures should not be taken the next time.

The National Lawyers Guild and some news outlets questioned the constitutionality of the door-to-door searches conducted by law enforcement officers looking for Dzhokhar Tsarnaev.

One Boston Day 

On the second anniversary of the Boston Marathon Bombings, Mayor Marty Walsh established April 15, the day of the bombings, as an official and permanent holiday called "One Boston Day", dedicated to conducting random acts of kindness and helping others out. Over the past eight years, some examples of acts of kindness being done have been donating blood to the American Red Cross, donating food to the Greater Boston Food Bank, opening free admission in places like the Museum of Science and Museum of Fine Arts, donating shoes to homeless shelters, and donating to military and veteran charities.

Conspiracy theories 
A number of conspiracy theories arose in the immediate wake of the attacks and after more information about the Tsarnaev brothers came to light. This can be common in the aftermath of acts of domestic terrorism, especially the September 11th attacks. In the days following the attacks, some conspiracy theories arose on the internet claiming they were false flag attacks committed by the United States government. As more information about the backgrounds of the Tsarnaev Brothers came to light, further conspiracy theories were disseminated. One claim, made by Dzhokhar Tsarnaev's defense attorney as well as some journalists, was that the FBI had tried to recruit Tamerlan Tsarnaev as an FBI informant in 2011. The FBI denied this claim in a press release, stating that "the Tsarnaev brothers were never sources for the FBI nor did the FBI attempt to recruit them as sources". The FBI is not required to release information on informants, and classified information on sources of intelligence constitutes an exception to the 25-year declassification window established by Executive Order 13526.

In 2011, a friend of Tamerlan Tsarnaev was murdered in Waltham, Massachusetts, along with two others. After the 2013 attacks, the investigation was reopened with Tamerlan Tsarnaev as a new suspect. The failure of the 2011 investigation to identify Tamerlan Tsarnaev as a major suspect led to claims among conspiracy theorists that the investigation of the 2011 Waltham triple murder had been suppressed by the FBI in order to maintain Tsarnaev's informant status. Theorists also cite the fact that the FBI has been criticized for an alleged practice under former director James Comey of encouraging confidential informants to attempt terrorist attacks. This alleged practice, combined with disputed claims of connections between the Tsarnaev brothers and intelligence services, have given rise to a conspiracy theory that the United States government had foreknowledge of the Tsarnaev brothers' plans to commit a terrorist attack, or that the attack was made at the direction of intelligence services. The Tsarnaev brother's uncle, Said-Hussein Tsarnaev, and other members of the Tsarnaev family have repeated this theory, as well as claiming neither brother actually committed the attacks. This claim also formed an element of Dzhokhar Tsarnaev's legal defense. No evidence or further claims supporting this theory have been confirmed by any US government agencies.

Conflicting reports 

On the afternoon of the bombing, the New York Post reported that a suspect, a Saudi Arabian male, was under guard and being questioned at a Boston hospital. That evening, Boston Police Commissioner Ed Davis said that there had not been an arrest. The Post did not retract its story about the suspect, leading to widespread reports by CBS News, CNN, and other media that a Middle Eastern suspect was in custody. The day after the bombing, a majority of outlets were reporting that the Saudi was a witness, not a suspect.

The New York Post on its April 18 front page showed two men, and said they were being sought by the authorities. The two men in question, a 17-year-old boy and his track coach, were not the ones being sought as suspects. The boy, from Revere, Massachusetts, turned himself over to the police immediately and was cleared after a 20-minute interview in which they advised him to deactivate his Facebook account. New York Post editor Col Allan stated, "We stand by our story. The image was emailed to law enforcement agencies yesterday afternoon seeking information about these men, as our story reported. We did not identify them as suspects." The two were implied to be possible suspects via crowdsourcing on the websites Reddit and 4chan.

Several other people were mistakenly identified as suspects. Two of those wrongly identified as suspects on Reddit were the 17-year-old track star noted above and Sunil Tripathi, a Brown University student missing since March. Tripathi was found dead on April 23 in the Providence River.

On April 17, the FBI released the following statement:

The decision to release the photos of the Tsarnaev brothers was made in part to limit damage done to those misidentified on the Internet and by the media, and to address concerns over maintaining control of the manhunt.

Film adaptation 
A film about the bombing and the subsequent manhunt, Patriots Day, was released in December 2016. Another film, Stronger, chronicling the experience of survivor Jeff Bauman, was released in September 2017.

See also 
 2011 Waltham triple murder, a triple homicide to which Tamerlan Tsarnaev has been connected
 Centennial Olympic Park bombing, a 1996 terrorist attack which also targeted a public event
 List of Islamist terrorist attacks

Footnotes

References

External links 

 
 

Congressional hearings
 
 
 

 
2013 in Boston
2013 in sports in Massachusetts
2013 murders in the United States
April 2013 crimes in the United States
April 2013 events in the United States
Articles containing video clips
Criminal duos
Boston Marathon
Boston Police Department
Copley Square
Deaths by firearm in Massachusetts
Disasters in Boston
Disasters in sports
Explosions in 2013
Filmed improvised explosive device bombings
History of Boston
History of the Massachusetts Institute of Technology
Improvised explosive device bombings in the United States
Islamic terrorism in the United States
Islamic terrorist incidents in 2013
Murder in Massachusetts
Plots and attacks using pressure cooker bombs
Politics and sports
Sports-related accidents and incidents
Terrorism in the United States
Terrorist incidents in Massachusetts
Terrorist incidents in the United States in 2013
Incidents of violence against boys
University and college shootings in the United States
Watertown, Massachusetts